Helsinki-Vantaa Airport, or simply Helsinki Airport, is the main international airport of the city of Helsinki, its surrounding metropolitan area, and the Uusimaa region. The airport is operated by state-owned Finavia.

The airport is by far the busiest in Finland (with 20 times the traffic of the next-busiest, Oulu) and the fourth busiest in the Nordic countries in terms of passenger numbers. About 90% of Finland's international air traffic passes through Helsinki Airport. The airport handled 21.8 million passengers in 2019, including 18.9 million international passengers and 2.9 million domestic passengers. On average, the airport handles around 350 departures a day.

The airport is the main hub for Finnair, the flag carrier of Finland, and its subsidiary Nordic Regional Airlines. It is also a hub for CityJet (on behalf of SAS) and an operating base for Jet Time, Norwegian Air Shuttle, SunClass Airlines and TUI fly Nordic. Helsinki Airport has around 50 regularly-operating airlines. The airport has around 80 scheduled destinations to other parts of Europe and 21 direct long-haul routes to Asia, the Middle East, and North America. There are also 35 charter destinations including numerous long-haul charter destinations.

Originally built for the 1952 Summer Olympics in Helsinki, the airport today provides jobs for 25,000 people and there are 1,500 companies that operate at this airport.

Finavia aims to strengthen the position of Helsinki Airport in transit passenger traffic between Europe and Asia, and to increase the number of direct connections to Europe. Helsinki Airport's minimum transit time of 35 minutes is among the shortest in Europe. According to Finavia's survey, as many as one in every three passengers select their flight route based on the transit airport.

History

Opening and the first intercontinental service (1952–1960s) 
The planning of a new airport for Helsinki began in the 1940s, when it became obvious that the Helsinki-Malmi Airport could not handle the increasing number of passengers or the new, heavier aircraft. Some of the construction work was done by prison laborers. The airport opened temporarily in July 1952 for that year's Summer Olympics, held in Helsinki.

The first two Aero Oy DC-3 aircraft, OH-LCC Tiira with its captain Olli Puhakka and first officer Pertti Uuksulainen, and OH-LCD Lokki, landed in Vantaa on 26 June 1952, and the first scheduled international airplane to land on the airport was the DC-6 B Torgil Viking of Scandinavian Airlines on 26 October 1952. While Aero (now Finnair) used Helsinki-Malmi Airport, charter flights were directed to the new airport on 26 October 1952. The airport originally had a single runway, the second runway being built four years later in 1956, and the first airplane hangar was also built in the same year. The airport also received its first radar in the same year. Regular jet flight operations began in 1959.

A new passenger terminal opened in 1969, while the first transatlantic service to New York was inaugurated on 15 May 1969. A contiguous fence around the entire airport area was built in spring 1973.

During this time period, the airport was also called Seutula Airport after the nearby village Seutula.

New terminal and first Asian flights (1970s–1990s) 
The year 1973 saw the first security checks being carried out for international flights. The name Helsinki-Vantaa Airport was used from 1977, with the airport being known as the Helsinki Airport before this. The postal code of the airport was 01530 Helsinki-Lento until 1974, 01530 Helsinki-Vantaa-Lento from 1974 to 1983 and 01530 Vantaa from 1983 onwards.

The Finnish Defence Forces surrounded the airport in late autumn 1977, in order to protect the airport from a possible terrorist strike by the Red Army Faction.

In 1983, the airport began offering the first non-stop service from Western Europe to Japan as Finnair commenced regular service between Helsinki and Tokyo with a single McDonnell Douglas DC-10-30ER. In the 1970s, Pan Am operated flights from Helsinki to the US. The passenger terminal was expanded for the first time in 1983 and five years later, in 1988, the airport handled over six million passengers annually.

In 1991, Delta Air Lines began its operations at the airport. A new terminal was constructed for domestic flights in 1993. In 1996 the international terminal was expanded and merged with the domestic terminal. At the same time, the new control tower was completed. In 1997 a new VIP President terminal was opened for official international state visits. In November 1999, the international terminal was further expanded and the lobby for arriving and departing passengers was built.

New millennium and expansion of non-Schengen area (2000–2009) 
A historical event in 2000 was that the annual number of visitors to the Helsinki-Vantaa Airport surpassed 10 million. Approach traffic control moved from the so-called "cave" into its new overground premises.

New border controls of the Schengen Agreement were taken into use in 2001. The third runway was inaugurated on 28 November 2002 and the first user was Finnair's McDonnell Douglas MD-11 en route to New York. In 2004, the international terminal was again expanded and a new shopping area was opened for long-haul passengers. A new air cargo service was opened for passengers with overweight luggage. 24 new automatic check-in terminals were taken into use in 2006.

On 13 August 2007 a new Hilton hotel, Hilton Helsinki-Vantaa Airport was opened near the airport, with 330 rooms. Independent use of parallel runways started in November 2007.

A free-of-charge WLAN network was opened at the airport on 25 November 2008.

In autumn 2009, the airport saw a great deal of industrial action, as Finavia outsourced check-in security controls. The security controls were moved over to the cleaning and building service concern SOL. The labour agreements also changed. SOL started co-operation negotiations for 80 employees in January 2010. Outsourcing the security services had a positive impact on Finavia's economy, as this allowed the company to reach significant cost savings during the first half of 2010 compared to the second half of the previous year. This was largely because of the outsourcing of the security services at the Helsinki Airport. In late 2012, the Labour Court of Finland gave a statement that the security services at the airport were under the labour agreement of the security guard industry. After this, SOL terminated its contract, to end at the end of 2014 in the middle of its contract period.

Finnair outsourced its baggage handling services from its daughter company Northport to Barona Handling in November to December 2009, after which the baggage handling employees went on an illegal strike for four days. During New Year from 2009 to 2010 thousands of bags lay untouched at the airport, inaccessible to their owners. According to the employees, there were one tenth less people handling the loading of the baggage than before. The Aviation Union accused Barona of neglecting safety regulations when unloading the accumulated pile of baggage during the industrial action. In January 2010 the Finnish News Agency wrote that some of the employees had sent baggage to the wrong destination on purpose. In 2009, the airport dropped out of the list of the Airport Service Quality research.

In 2009, an expansion of Terminal 2 was completed. The same year witnessed the opening of a new shopping area and spa for passengers on long-haul flights, the removal of a terminal-specific division between domestic and international flights in favour a division by airline, and the renovation of Terminal 1 for international flights. In the same year, TAP Air Portugal commenced service between Helsinki and Lisbon.

Five new passenger bridges for wide-body aircraft were opened in 2009. The spa was closed down in 2012 because of lack of use. In 2011 the annual number of passengers at the airport grew by 15.5% to 14.9 million passengers. About 25% of passengers were transferring to a connecting flight at the airport. 12.2 million passengers were on international flights and 2.7 million on domestic flights. A total of 1.63 million passengers were on flights to Asia.

Significant growth and expansion (2010–present) 
During the 2010s, Helsinki Airport has experienced large increases in the number of annual passengers. In 2010, the airport handled 12,883,399 passengers, an increase of 2.2 percent compared to 2009. Air freight increased by 29.4 percent.

In April 2010, Norwegian Air Shuttle opened its first routes to Oslo and Stockholm using Boeing 737 jets. Now the airline is one of the largest operators at the airport with almost 40 destinations in Europe, Asia, and Africa. In 2011, Helsinki Airport saw its biggest growth in a single year in the number of passengers. The number of annual passengers was increased by 2 million passengers and the airport reached the milestone of 14 million passengers. However, easyJet canceled three routes, from Helsinki to Manchester, London–Gatwick, and Paris–Charles de Gaulle, citing weak demand at Helsinki.

In November 2011, Austrian Airlines canceled its Vienna–Helsinki operations. In the same year, Czech Airlines ceased its Helsinki operations due to low demand. A year after, LOT Polish Airlines canceled its service to Helsinki. In 2014, a number of airlines such as Aer Lingus, Germanwings, S7 Airlines  canceled services to Helsinki.

In the 2010s, the airport has seen a huge growth of long-haul flights in terms of weekly flights (see Long-haul traffic below).

In the beginning of 2015, the renovation and construction work related to the development of Helsinki Airport started. For example, the Baggage Claim Hall 2B and Arrival Hall 2A were renovated and in July 2015, train operation on the Ring Rail Line and connection to Helsinki Central Railway Station were opened. In March 2015, Swiss International Air Lines started operations to Helsinki but canceled it a year later. In late 2015, Blue1 ceased all operations from Helsinki which was the airline's only base. The airline flew to 28 destinations in Europe. Scandinavian Airlines sold Blue1 to CityJet, which continues to operate the company on behalf of SAS as part of a larger relationship. In 2015, the airport handled up to 16 million passengers for the first time. In March 2016, Czech Airlines resumed flights from Prague to Helsinki using Airbus A319 aircraft. On 10 October 2016, the first Gulf carrier Qatar Airways began operations at the airport and now operates to Helsinki by Boeing 787 Dreamliner. The carrier was initially planning to launch the service as early as in 2012. Finavia expects that the airport will handle over 18,5 million passengers in 2017 and around 20 million in 2018, in 2019 at the latest. Also in 2017, the airport has experienced huge growth in numbers of passengers flying intercontinental.

As of 2013, Finavia has been expanding the airport (see Future expansion below).

Life in HEL (#lifeinhel) was a Finavia marketing campaign which took place from 10 October to 9 November 2017 at Helsinki Airport. The campaign mixed TV, game shows, and social media. Ryan Zhu, a Chinese actor and TV personality, lived in a little cabin inside Helsinki Airport for 30 days. Helsinki Airport was awarded the title of best airport in the world by Travellink; by the campaign, Finavia wanted to prove this claim.

A free-of-charge film theatre named Airport Cinema was opened near gate 33 in November 2018.

A new terminal expansion was opened in 2012. The terminals 1 and 2 were combined on 21 June 2022 so that all flights are now operated from a single terminal.

Construction projects 
In spring 2010 a new baggage handling centre utilising the latest technology was taken into use at the airport, concentrating all handling of departing and transferring baggage. Handling of arriving baggage remains at its current handling facility.

The parts of the airport that were completed in 1969 and 1983 were thoroughly renovated. Basic repairs were completed in 2012.

Runway 3 (22R/04L) was repaired from April to June 2012, during which time the runway was out of use. After this the taxiway next to runway 2 (15/33) was repaired, during which time runway 2 served as a temporary taxiway. The repairs were completed in September 2012.

The main runway 04R/22L was repaired in summer 2015 and was reopened in early August.

The Helsinki Airport station was opened on 10 July 2015. The Ring Rail Line connects the Helsinki–Riihimäki railway in the north with the Vantaankoski railway in the west. The trip from the airport to the Helsinki Central station takes about half an hour, and the trip to Tikkurila railway station takes about ten minutes. The Helsinki Airport station was built underground between the parking garages P3A and P1/P2. The station has a walking connection to the connecting corridor between terminals 1 and 2.

Expansion of the terminals started in early 2016 from the southern wing of the long-distance flight area, which was completed in summer 2017. After this, construction of the western wing was started, which was completed in autumn 2019. Expansion of terminal 1 was also started in 2017, giving the terminal an additional 3,500 square metres of floor area. Terminal 1 was lengthened by 230 metres and gained seven new departure gates.

As part of the development program, a new parking garage was also opened, with a connection to the terminal. The new parking garage is equipped with solar panels, and it has an area for recharging 200 electric cars. The development program also included about 2000 new parking places.

Expansion of the terminal is undergoing to the north of the terminal building, including expansion of the number of commercial services, gates and docks for airplanes. The expansion also includes improvement of passenger connections to the terminal. The expansion was taken into use in late 2021.

The undergoing development program is scheduled to be completed in 2023. Before this, new lobbies for departing and arriving passengers and a connecting travel centre were taken into use. Also the old departure lobby of Terminal 2 will be changed into part of the Schengen gate area, expanding the size of the area considerably.

During New Year 2020 to 2021 a three-year repair project of the station level was completed, not included in the development program. The purpose of the repair project, which cost 32 million euro, is to ensure the safety of taxiing and parking the airplanes and to improve the capacity and effectiveness of air traffic. The infrastructure of the station level will be modernised, allowing a further decrease of environmental impacts of air traffic.

A two-part Avia Pilot building with 13 floors was built within walking distance of the terminal, with Finavia as its main tenant. In early 2018 a new Scandic Hotels hotel with 148 rooms was opened in the building. This is the third hotel in the immediate vicinity of the airport.

Interior gallery

Composition 

The airport has one terminal. The terminal capacity of the airport is approximately 16–17 million passengers per year.

Domestic flights, as well as flights to European Schengen countries, are operated from gates 11–31. Long-haul and European non-Schengen flights are operated from gates 31–38.

In 2014, Helsinki Airport introduced the world's first passenger tracking system, which automatically monitors crowd congestion and prevents bottlenecks at the airport.

The airport's signage is in English, Finnish, Swedish, Korean, Chinese, Japanese, and Russian.

Terminal 1 

Terminal 1 opened in 1952 and was the first terminal at the airport. The terminal was used for domestic flights but as of 2009, it was also used for international flights. As part of Helsinki Airport's 10-year development programme, Terminal 1 was closed on 21 June 2022 and all flights have been concentrated in a single terminal.

Terminal 2 
Terminal 2 (gates 16–55) opened in 1969 for international operations and, at present, also serves domestic flights. It is the larger of the two passenger terminals at the airport. All intercontinental flights operate from Terminal 2. The non-Schengen area of Terminal 2 has been enlarged in 2009 enabling the airport to accommodate eight wide-body aircraft at gates simultaneously while a new shopping area and a spa were opened for passengers on long-distance flights and the division between domestic and international flights was removed. Terminal 2 has many restaurants, bars and shopping areas. The terminal is equipped with 26 aircraft parking stands with passenger bridges. The terminal has a train connection to Helsinki Central railway station.

Terminal 2 passenger facilities include: numerous tax-free shops, Avis, Europcar and Hertz-car rentals, free wireless Internet access, power sockets, lockers, sleeping pods and transfer service desks. Currency exchange, cash machines (ATM), tourist information, an Alepa grocery store and pharmacy are also available. For children, there are also several playrooms. Dining facilities include Burger King and O'Learys Sports Bar as well as numerous other restaurants and cafés. Terminal 2 also includes two Finnair lounges: Finnair Lounge in the Schengen-area and Finnair Premium Lounge in the non-Schengen area.

As a part of Helsinki Airport's expansion plan, the new South Pier was inaugurated in June 2017 and Aukio in February 2019. The new pier features moving walkways and dual boarding jet bridges to enable handling larger aircraft more efficiently. In November 2019, the West Pier opened and it is able to accommodate the Airbus A380 superjumbo. Five of the gates are able to accommodate two regional jets, such as Boeing 737s or Airbus A320s, simultaneously at a single gate. Passengers arriving and departing are divided into two floors: one for arriving passengers, the other for departures. In June 2016, the new bus terminal for remote aircraft stand operations was opened to increase the airport's capacity with gates 50A-M.

Terminal 2 is used by member airlines of Oneworld and Skyteam airline alliances and most of the non-aligned airlines. Turkish Airlines makes an exception among Star Alliance airlines by using Terminal 2. Almost all charter flights are handled at Terminal 2 (which also handles scheduled services). The current airlines using Terminal 2 are Aeroflot, Air France, Belavia, Blue Air, British Airways, Corendon Airlines, Czech Airlines, Finnair, Nordic Regional Airlines, Freebird Airlines, Jet Time, Japan Airlines, KLM, Norwegian Air Shuttle, Nouvelair Tunisie, Qatar Airways, Royal Jordanian, Sunclass Airlines, Tibet Airlines, TUI fly Nordic, TUI Airways, Turkish Airlines and Ukraine International Airlines.

Other buildings 

There are several airport hotels and office buildings on the grounds of the airport. The Aviapolis is a new international business park adjacent to the Helsinki airport area, already hosting the operations of numerous companies around the airport. In 2013, Finnair opened its new head office, known as House of Travel and Transportation, or "HOTT". The construction of HOTT began in July 2011 and finished on time in June 2013.

Ground handling 
Airpro, Aviator, and Swissport provide ground handling services for airlines.

Runways 

Helsinki Airport has three runways. The runways can handle take-offs and landings of the heaviest aircraft in use today such as the Airbus A380. The use of three runways allows two runways to be kept in operation when clearing of snow and ice is needed (if one runway is being cleared at a time).

Runway usage principles 

There are about twenty different runway combinations in use. The primary runway for landings is Runway 2 (15) from the northwest, i.e. from the direction of Nurmijärvi, or Runway 1 (22L) from the northeast, i.e. from the direction of Kerava, while the primary runway for take-offs is Runway 3 (22R) towards the southwest, in the direction of Western Vantaa and Espoo. Aircraft with low noise can take off from Runway 1 (22L) towards the south at the same time. When the wind is from the north or east, Runway 3 (04L) or Runway 1 (04R) are usually used for landings, i.e. for approaches from the southwest, the direction of Western Vantaa and Espoo, while take-offs are made from Runway 1 (04R) towards the northeast in the direction of Kerava.

During the night time, landings are primarily made using Runway 2 (15) from the northwest, i.e. from the direction of Nurmijärvi, and take-offs using Runway 3 (22R) towards the southwest, in the direction of Espoo. Jet plane landings to Runway 2 (33) from the southeast and take-offs from Runway 2 (15) towards the southeast are avoided due to dense population in the affected areas. During night time, propeller plane operations towards the southeast are also prohibited unless otherwise dictated by air traffic safety. Air traffic safety is the main reason for not always being able to choose the optimal runway for noise control.

Technology

Airport-CDM 

In October 2012, Finavia implemented Airport CDM (Collaborative Decision Making) at Helsinki Airport. It is a procedure by Eurocontrol, the European Organization for Safety of Air Navigation, that develops airport operation by increasing co-operation between partners at the airport. Airport CDM aims to reduce costs, achieve lower emissions, improve punctuality of operations and increase customer satisfaction at the airport. Helsinki Airport was the seventh European and first Northern European airport to adopt the program.

Operations

Passenger operations 

Helsinki Airport is connected to over 140 destinations worldwide and over 50 countries by passenger services. Helsinki Airport has around 50 airlines operating regularly. In addition, there are numerous charter airlines operating at the airport. The airport is the main hub for Finnair, that operates over 1100 flights weekly to Europe, Asia, and North America. The airport is also used as an operating base for Norwegian Air Shuttle and the low-cost airline operates over 230 flight weekly to elsewhere in Europe as well as the United Arab Emirates and Morocco.

Main airlines 

The following airlines maintain hub or base operations at Helsinki Airport:

 Finnair is the largest airline operating at the airport, with an all-Airbus fleet of 48 aircraft (excluding Norra) based at Helsinki, providing scheduled services to the Middle East, Asia, Europe, and North-America. Finnair operates flights from Helsinki to over 100 destinations, including around 20 intercontinental routes. All flights are operated from Terminal 2.
 Jet Time is a charter airline that operates several flights from Helsinki to Europe.
 Nordic Regional Airlines (Norra), a subsidiary of Finnair that operates to around 30 destinations in Europe. Norra has a fleet of 23 ATR and Embraer aircraft, all operated for Finnair. This airline operates from Terminal 2.
 Norwegian Air Shuttle, a low-cost airline which operates to over 30 destinations from Helsinki to Europe and the Middle East, operating from Terminal 2. The airline is the biggest operator at the airport after Finnair (including Norra) and has served over 10 million passengers since 2010.
 SunClass Airlines uses Helsinki Airport as a focus city with many charter flights to Southeast Asia and Europe. The airline operates from Terminal 2.
 TUI fly Nordic, a charter airline that operates to Southeast Asia, Europe, and the Caribbean in North America. The airline operates from Terminal 2. On 10 September 2018, TUI announced plans to close its Helsinki base in the near future with Jet Time taking over the company's short-haul operations at the airport.

Passenger numbers have been growing rapidly since 2010, but especially since 2014. In 2017, Helsinki Airport experienced the third highest growth rate and the second biggest increase in passenger numbers in the last 20 years. On 13 December 2017, the airport reached the milestone of 18 million passengers for the first time ever.

Cargo operations 

Helsinki Airport has been one of the largest airports among the Nordic countries by freight handled. In 2012, the airport handled 192,204 tonnes cargo making the airport the largest one in the Nordics in tonnes of cargo handled that year.

Helsinki Airport has extensive cargo flight activity. There is a cargo area with cargo terminals and cargo transit facilities in the Southeastern part of the airport area. ASL Airlines Belgium (formerly TNT Airways) and DHL have their own cargo terminals at the airport. Currently scheduled cargo operating airlines are AirBridgeCargo Airlines operated with Boeing 747 cargo aircraft, ASL Airlines Belgium, DHL Aviation (operated by EAT Leipzig and DHL Air UK), FedEx, UPS Airlines, and Turkish Airlines that operates cargo services to HEL from Istanbul, Oslo, and Stockholm with Airbus A310F and A330F aircraft. In addition to scheduled cargo operations, many other cargo airlines have random operations at Helsinki Airport.

The construction of a new freight terminal began in March 2015 and was inaugurated on 8 January 2018. The capacity of the terminal is 350,000 tonnes but the theoretical capacity is up to 450,000 tonnes. The freight capacity of the airport is being expanded to accommodate the growing freight capacity that will be provided by Finnair's Airbus A350 XWB fleet. Finnair's freight operations continued in the previous location until relocation to the new freight terminal in December 2017. The name of the new terminal is Cool Nordic Cargo Hub, but is branded COOL for its modern technology and capacity to handle high volumes of temperature-controlled cargo. A new operations monitoring and tracking platform, "Cargo Eye", is used in the new freight terminal. That gives the new Cargo Control Center a live view of what is happening across the cargo network and where everything is located. The terminal has 29 stands for truck transports.

Long-haul traffic 
The airport saw its first long-haul route on 15 May 1969 when Finnair commenced flights to New York City via Copenhagen and Amsterdam. The first non-stop route to East Asia was commenced in 1983 with Finnair's flight to Tokyo, with Beijing following five years later.

Today 36 intercontinental routes to North America, Asia, and the Middle East operate from Helsinki Airport. Long-haul traffic is a major part of the airport's traffic much of it supported by Finnair, the largest carrier at the airport. Helsinki Airport is an important transfer airport between Europe and Asia. In 2018, Helsinki Airport handled approximately 3.7 million transfer passengers, which is 21.0% more than in 2017. At the beginning of 2018, over 140 weekly flights were flown directly from Helsinki to Asia.

Asia is the largest long-haul market in both number of destinations and weekly frequencies. Finnair and Japan Airlines had long been the only carriers flying to Asia from Helsinki, but in 2019, Tibet Airlines, Juneyao Airlines and Sichuan Airlines launched non-stop flights from Jinan, Shanghai and Chengdu respectively. As of November 2019, the airport has direct connections to 7 destinations (8 airports) in China, namely Beijing (Capital and Daxing), Shanghai, Guangzhou, Chengdu, Nanjing, Jinan, and Xi'an. Finnair also operates 14 weekly flights to Hong Kong. In addition to China, Japan is a notable market for the airport to which there are flights to five destinations as of December 2019 and in March 2020, flights to Tokyo Haneda commence. India has been connected to the airport since 2006 by direct flights to Delhi. Recently, more flights have been added to traffic between the Middle East and Helsinki. In 2016, Qatar Airways launched daily flights from Doha and now operates 14 weekly flights to Helsinki. In 2018, flydubai began flights from Dubai.

North America has usually been a much smaller market than Asia for Helsinki Airport. However, during the decade, the market has grown and route launches to destinations such as Chicago, Miami, San Francisco, and Los Angeles have been made. American Airlines opened a connection to Chicago in 2011. In 2015, Finnair discontinued its seasonal route to Toronto–Pearson, but commenced flights to Chicago, followed by San Francisco two years later. As of March 2019, Helsinki Airport is connected to 5 destinations in the US and 3 destinations in Latin America.

Airlines and destinations

Passenger 

Helsinki Airport offers non-stop flights to 162 destinations in over 50 countries around the world operated by 50 airlines. These include more than 100 cities in Europe and the Middle East, over 20 in Asia, and 8 in North America. The following airlines offer flights at Helsinki Airport:

{{Airport-dest-list

| Aegean Airlines | Athens  Seasonal: Kalamata

| airBaltic | Riga

| Air France | Paris–Charles de Gaulle
 
 |  | Stockholm–Bromma  Seasonal: Visby

| Budapest Aircraft Service | Pori

| Eurowings | Berlin (begins 26 March 2023)

| Finnair | Alicante, Amsterdam, Bangkok–Suvarnabhumi, Barcelona, Bergen, Berlin, Brussels, Budapest, Copenhagen, Dallas/Fort Worth, Delhi, Doha, Dublin, Düsseldorf, Edinburgh, Frankfurt, Gazipaşa, Geneva, Gothenburg, Hamburg, Hong Kong, Ivalo, Joensuu, Jyväskylä, Kajaani, Kemi, Kittilä, Kokkola, Kraków, Kuopio, Kuusamo, Lisbon, London–Heathrow, Los Angeles, Madrid, Málaga, Manchester, Mariehamn, Milan–Linate (begins 26 March 2023), Milan–Malpensa, Mumbai, Munich, New York–JFK, Osaka–Kansai (resumes 26 March 2023), Oslo, Oulu, Paris–Charles de Gaulle, Prague, Reykjavík–Keflavík, Riga, Rome–Fiumicino, Rovaniemi, Seoul–Incheon, Shanghai–Pudong, Singapore, Stockholm–Arlanda, Tallinn, Tampere, Tel Aviv, Tokyo–Haneda, Tokyo–Narita, Tromsø, Trondheim, Turku,  Vaasa, Vienna, Vilnius, Warsaw–Chopin, Zurich  Seasonal: Antalya, Billund, Bodø (begins 27 May 2023), Bologna, Chania, Corfu, Chicago–O'Hare, Dubai–International, Dubrovnik, Eilat, Funchal, Gran Canaria, Heraklion, Innsbruck, Karpathos (begins 16 May 2023),Lanzarote, Larnaca, Ljubljana (resumes 1 April 2023), Miami, Naples, Nice, Palma de Mallorca, Phuket, Rhodes, Salzburg, Santorini, Seattle/Tacoma, Split, Tenerife–South,  Venice, Verona, Visby, Zagreb

| Icelandair | Reykjavík–Keflavík

| Japan Airlines | Tokyo–Haneda

| Juneyao Airlines | Shanghai–Pudong, Zhengzhou

| KLM | Amsterdam

| Lufthansa | Frankfurt, Munich

| Norwegian Air Shuttle | Alicante, Copenhagen, London–Gatwick, Málaga, Oslo, Rovaniemi, Stockholm–Arlanda  Seasonal: Athens, Barcelona, Burgas, Chania, Dubrovnik, Larnaca, Nice, Palma de Mallorca, Pisa, Pristina, Rhodes, Split, Tenerife–South, Tivat, Venice

| NyxAir | Pärnu (begins 25 May 2023)<ref>,

Cargo

Traffic statistics 

Helsinki Airport is the fourth-busiest airport in the Nordics, serving over 20.8 million passengers in 2018. Nonetheless, Helsinki has the largest number of Asian destinations of all Nordic airports and in 2015, the airport was the fifth busiest airport in Europe in terms of flights to Asia. As of 2018, Helsinki Airport is connected to Asia with over 140 weekly flights. When ranked by connectivity, the airport is the best-connected airport in Northern Europe with around 10,000 connections worldwide, 85% more than in Copenhagen which is the 2nd best-connected airport in the Nordics. The number of connections from Helsinki Airport has grown by 96% in a decade. In Europe, the airport is the 12th best-connected airport. According to Airports Council International (ACI), Helsinki Airport was one of the fastest growing airports in Europe in 2017.

In 2016, passengers from Japan, China, South Korea and United States made up the four largest groups of non-European travelers at Helsinki Airport. The airport handled around 386,000 Japanese passengers, 321,000 Chinese passengers, 136,000 Korean passengers and 98,000 US citizens. Other major nationalities were Singapore, Thailand, Turkey, Malaysia, Ukraine, Vietnam, Taiwan, Israel and Indonesia.

Over the last few years, the number of passengers going through Helsinki Airport has grown significantly. In 2010, the airport handled 12,900,000 passengers while by 2018, the number of annual passengers had nearly doubled to over 20,800,000.

Ground transport 
The airport is located in the immediate vicinity of Ring III and Finnish national road 45. The railway running beneath the airport in a tunnel is connected to the Helsinki commuter rail.

Rail 

The railway link to the airport opened for traffic in July 2015 and serves local commuter trains running at 10-minute intervals during peak periods. On evenings the train run every 15 minutes and at quieter times every 30 minutes. The railway is trafficked by low-floor Stadler FLIRT trains, operated by the VR Group.

The westbound commuter line "I" runs to Helsinki Central Station via Huopalahti in just over 30 minutes, while the eastbound commuter line "P" runs to Helsinki Central Station via Tikkurila in just under 30 minutes. Eastbound trains stop at Tikkurila (8 minutes away) where passengers can transfer to long-distance trains going away from Helsinki, in the directions of Tampere and Lahti, including lines to Saint Petersburg and Moscow.

The last P service downtown leaves nightly at 01:01 (01:31 on Fridays and Saturdays). During the night time service break, bus lines 562N to Tikkurila railway station and 615 to downtown Helsinki provide night service to and from the Airport.

Plans also exist for a direct connection between Helsinki Central, the airport, and the long-distance rail network via Kerava. This line, known as Lentorata, is projected to run in a tunnel for most of its approximately 30 km length.

A trip from Helsinki city centre to the airport requires a ticket for zones ABC, costing 4.10 euro for adults and 2.10 euro for children from 7 to 17 years. Children under 7 years travel for free.

Taxi 
Taxi ranks are located outside Terminal 1 and Terminal 2.

Taxis leave departing passengers directly in front of the main doors of the terminal, with an entrance to flight check-in. Arriving passengers are served by a taxi station on the arriving flights floor. The taxi station has lanes, of which passengers can choose the taxi that best suits them.

Since 1 January 2022, contracted taxis at the Helsinki Airport are operated by Mankkaan Taksi Oy, Taksi Helsinki Oy and Menevä Oy. Other taxi companies can also provide their services, with the customer negotiating the transport price themselves.

Bus 

There is regular bus service by bus line 615 from the airport to Helsinki Central railway station (mainly through the Tuusulanväylä) and to major hotels and railway stations in the Greater Helsinki area that operates 24-hours a day, mostly every half-hour. The chief operator of these services is the Helsinki Regional Transport Authority (HSL). Complete list of local services is available at the HSL-website.

Coach connections, daytime and overnight, to all parts of Finland are provided by Matkahuolto and ExpressBus. They depart from the airport coach terminal.

Depending on the point of time, a trip from the Helsinki city centre to the airport on bus line 600 takes about 40 to 55 minutes. The trunk bus routes 600 and 570 are in traffic 24 hours a day. The Aviapolis railway station near the airport offers connections to several bus lines.

Until 2020 the Finnair City Bus, operated by Pohjolan Liikenne, provided a direct bus connection from the Eliel Square in central Helsinki to the ariport. Tickets bought from Finnair's webshop cost 6.80 euro for adults and 3.40 euro for children from 7 to 17 years. Tickets bought onboard cost ten cents more. As well as the Eliel Square, the bus line stopped at the Hesperia Park and if necessary, at other express bus stops along the way. A trip on the Finnair City Bus from the Eliel Square to the airport took about 30 minutes. In spring 2020 the service was suspended because of the COVID-19 pandemic, and in autumn 2020 Pohjolan Liikenne announced it would discontinue the service permanently. The service operated for the last time on 22 March 2020.

There are also daily bus connections to the Helsinki Airport from Turku and Tampere.

Parking 
In August 2016 there were about 13 thousand parking spaces at the Helsinki Airport. Some of the spaces were taken out of use in January 2019 when the parking garage P1/P2 located near the terminal was dismantled to make way for the new entrance to the airport.

The airport has two parking garages (P3 and P5) as well as two outdoor parking areas (P4A and P4B). The free-of-charge bus service AirPortBus operated by Finavia travels between the parking areas and the terminal.

There are also companies providing airport parking services near the airport, where passengers can leave their cars in a guarded area and get transport to the airport.

Accidents and hijackings 

 On 2 December 1957 the approach of an Aeroflot Ilyushin Il-14 from Leningrad went too far in the thick fog, and the pilots failed to stop the plane until the end of the runway. The plane overran the runway and finally stopped at a highway embankment to the south of the airport area. The plane was carrying sixteen passengers and five crewmembers, of which ten people were injured. The accident site was closed off. There was no attempt to fix the plane in Finland. The plane was the size of a Convair Metropolitan, and it was disassembled and taken to the Soviet Union by car.
 On 19 August 1963, a Karair Convair CV-440 Metropolitan (OH-VKM) was damaged during landing to Helsinki Airport. During the landing in a thunderstorm the plane bounced three times off the runway and finally its nose wheel assembly broke. The plane fell down on its nose, both of its propellers hit the ground and the plane dragged along the runway for 1300 metres.
The plane was fixed by January the next year and remained in service until 1973.
On 21 August 1963, another Karair Convair CV-440-98 Metropolitan (OH-VKN) was damaged during landing to Helsinki Airport. The plane bounced three times off the runway, and on its last impact its nose wheel assembly broke, and the left middle wing was bent and twisted. The plane fell down on its nose, its propellers hit the ground, and the plane finally dragged onto the lawn to the left of the runway.
Both Convair Metropolitan accidents were partly caused because air traffic control had been forbidden to provide complete information about the weather at the airport to approaching planes. Only the direction and speed of the wind were reported, not any approaching or present thunderstorms. The pilot of OH-VKN lost sight of the airport at a critical moment because of heavy rain and temporary blindness caused by a lightning flash.
On 10 July 1977, two young Soviet men hijacked an Aeroflot Tupolev Tu-134 travelling from Petrozavodsk to Leningrad, trying to get to Stockholm. Because of lack of fuel, the plane had to land at Helsinki Airport. The hijacking situation lasted for three days, after which the hijackers surrendered to the police and were transported back to the Soviet Union.
On 30 September 1978 37-year-old former contractor Aarno Lamminparras hijacked a Finnair Sud Aviation Caravelle from Oulu to Helsinki. The plane visited Amsterdam and then returned to Helsinki Airport. Lamminparras surrendered to the police on 1 October. None of the 44 passengers on the plane were injured or killed.
On 31 January 2005 a Nord-Flyg AB Cessna C208B on a cargo flight to Sweden crashed on the ground between the first and third runways soon after take-off. The reason of the accident was stalling caused by snow and ice left on the upper surface of the wing. The pilot, the only person on the plane, was slightly injured in the accident.

Future expansion and plans

Master plan 2020 
In October 2013, Finavia received a capital injection of €200,000,000 from the Finnish Government. The investment enabled Finavia to start a development program worth €900,000,000 at Helsinki Airport, aiming at maintaining the strong position of Helsinki Airport in transit traffic between Europe and Asia. The program started in January 2014 and is planned to last until February 2020. It is expected to generate about 14,000 person-years of employment. Helsinki Airport was expected to serve 20 million passengers per year by 2020 and create about 5,000 new jobs at the airport. However, the airport served almost 21 million passengers in 2018; two years before the target. The expansion will increase capacity at the airport to 30 million passengers. In order to achieve this, the airport will expand both of its terminals and open a new entrance in place of the current parking and public transport area.

The Suomi-rata project, started in 2019, aims to build a new railway connection to the airport. It would create a new, twice as fast connection from the airport to the Helsinki Central railway station as well as a connection to the Finnish Main Line, allowing direct rail access to the airport also from elsewhere in Finland.

Development timeline 
Among the completed and planned projects are:

 Completed projects
 Renewal of Baggage Claim Hall 2B – completed January 2015
 Renovation of Arrival Hall 2A – completed June 2015
 Train connection – completed July 2015
 Renovation of Runway 1 – completed August 2015
 New bus terminal for remote aircraft stand operations – completed June 2016
 3,000 new parking spaces – completed August 2016
 New aircraft engine test site – completed October 2016
 The new south pier – completed June 2017
 Finnair's new cargo terminal – Late 2017
 Scandic hotel – completed March 2018
 Aukio – completed February 2019
 Expansion of Terminal 1 – completed 10 April 2019
 Expansion of border control – completed July 2019
 The new west pier – completed November 2019
 Gate area 17-19 expansion – completed December 2019
 Gate area 34-36 expansion – completed September 2021
 New entrance – completed December 2021
 New departure hall and new security control area – 2022
 Planned projects, projects under construction
 Expansion of Schengen gate area – 2023

Terminal expansion 
Helsinki Airport has capacity for about 17 million passengers annually, although this number was passed in 2016. Finavia decided to expand the current terminal building to respond to the expected passenger growth within the following years.

Part of the plan was to build a satellite terminal next to Terminal 2, but the plan was cancelled in favour of expansion under a single terminal building. In September 2014, Finavia revealed more detailed plans for the future expansion that will take place between 2014 and 2020. According to the plan Terminals 1 and 2 will be combined and expanded under one roof. This expansion work is one of Finland's largest construction projects. The expansion was designed by the Finnish architects' office PES-Architects. The same office designed the previous Helsinki Airport expansions completed in 1996 and 1999, as well as the circular parking buildings in front of the terminal. The surface area will increase by 45%, luggage handling capacity will increase by 50%.

Expansion of Terminal 1 
Finavia plans to expand Terminal 1, which is used for flights within the Schengen area. The construction is scheduled to be started in November 2017. Terminal 1 will be expanded by four separate departure gate buildings which will be connected by walking corridors. Each building will have one departure gate excluding one, which will have three gates. Gates (5–11) will not be equipped with jet bridges. Buildings will have two floors.

Expansion of Terminal 2 
Terminal 2 will have new gates (8 additional gates to Terminal 2) and aircraft stands on the apron. All gates for long-haul flights will have double jet bridges (such as the ones at Incheon International Airport) to enable handling larger aircraft more efficiently. Finavia has signed a contract with Thyssen Krupp Airport Systems for 16 widebody aircraft stands with up to 33 new jet bridges. New jet bridges were installed to gates 38 and 39 (now 53 and 54). Gate 48 can accommodate the Airbus A380 superjumbo and there are new aircraft stands on the apron accommodating the A380. Five of the gates will be able to accommodate two regional jets, such as Boeing 737s or Airbus A320s, simultaneously at a single gate. Two of these gates are located at West Pier.

In June 2016, the new bus terminal for remote aircraft stand operations was opened to increase the airport's capacity with gates 50A-M.

The new South Pier of Terminal 2 was inaugurated on 10 July 2017. The first scheduled flight from the new pier, AY006 departed from Gate 54 to New York City. In addition to the new terminal building, new dual boarding gates S54 and S55 as well as aircraft stands 171 and 172 were opened. Construction of the southern wing of Terminal 2 started on 4 January 2016. The construction took around 18 months. There are two floors: one for arriving passengers, the other for departures and gates 52 to 55. All the gates have dual boarding jet bridges. The new wing also features the first moving walkway at any airport in Finland.

On 20 September 2016, the construction on the West Pier began, even though it was expected to start in summer 2017. The first part of the west wing is expected to be finished in April 2019 while the entire pier was completed in October 2019. The west wing represents some €300,000,000 of Finavia's substantial total investment of €900,000,000. The first part of the west wing built is the large central plaza, "Aukio", which was opened in February 2019. It brings  of new passenger and baggage facilities to the airport. The pier is equipped with nine gates for widebody jets. Gate 48 is able to accommodate the Airbus A380.

The Helsinki Airport development program also includes plans to expand Terminal 2 to the area currently used for parking and public transport. This would provide more space for check-in, security control and baggage operations, allowing the airport to concentrate all departure and arrival services in a single terminal. On December 1, 2021, a new multimodal travel center will be opened in connection with Terminal 2, among other things, to streamline access to the airport from the train station and bus terminal.

New cargo terminal 
The construction of a new freight terminal began in March 2015. The capacity of the terminal is being expanded to accommodate the growing freight capacity that will be provided by Finnair's Airbus A350 XWB fleet. Finnair's freight operations will continue in the current location until relocation to the new freight terminal in Spring 2017.

Contextual engine 
Part of the rehaul of Helsinki Airport has included the development of a contextual engine that uses artificial intelligence to digest passenger data in ways that make passing through the airport a more pleasant experience. The benefits come from an array of small improvements; for example, digital signs change language according to the nationalities of those getting off a flight. Passengers are also continuously kept abreast of how long it will take them to reach their gates or pass through security control. Monocle named the contextual engine built by technology firm Reaktor as one of the top transportation innovations of 2018.

Planned third terminal 
In addition to the terminal expansion, Finavia has also contemplated building a third terminal at Helsinki Airport. According to Finavia's tentative plan, the new terminal would be located between runways 04R/22L and 04L/22R, while runway 15/33 would be removed. The terminal would be the principal terminal at the airport but the check-in area would stay in the current terminal building. The decision to build the third terminal has not yet been taken.

See also 

 List of the busiest airports in the Nordic countries

References

External links 

 
 

1952 establishments in Finland
Airports established in 1952
Airports in Finland
Airport
Airport
Airport
International airports in Finland